Mirza Mazharul Islam (1 January 1927 – 11 October 2020) was a Bangladeshi surgeon and language movement veteran.

Life
Islam was born on 1 January 1927 in Agacaran village under Kalihati in Tangail of the then British India. His father Helaluddin was an officer in a British company and mother Chhanda Khatun was a housewife.

He was the chief consultant at the Department of Surgery in BIRDEM. In recognition of his contribution to the Bengali language movement, the government of Bangladesh awarded him the country's second highest civilian award Ekushey Padak in 2018.

Islam died from COVID-19 complications  on 11 October 2020 at BIRDEM Hospital in Dhaka.

Death
Mirza Mazharul Islam died from COVID-19 complications on 11 October 2020 at BIRDEM Hospital in Dhaka

References

1927 births
2020 deaths
People from Tangail District
Dhaka Medical College alumni
Surendranath College alumni
Bengali language movement activists
20th-century surgeons
Recipients of the Ekushey Padak
Deaths from the COVID-19 pandemic in Bangladesh